Louis Poulsen is a Danish lighting manufacturer that was founded in 1874. Louis Poulsen Lighting is represented by subsidiaries, distribution offices and agents around the world. Their key sales regions are Scandinavia, Europe, Japan and United States. Some of Louis Poulsen's best designers were Arne Jacobsen and Poul Henningsen. Some of their signature products are the PH-Lamps.

History

In 1874 Ludvig R. Poulsen set up a wine importing business under the name Kjøbenhavns direkte Vin-Import-Kompagni (The Copenhagen Direct Wine Import Company). The firm closed down in 1878. In 1892 Ludvig Poulsen opened his second business, this time selling tools and electrical supplies. In 1896 Ludvig R. Poulsen hired his nephew, Louis Poulsen. Ludvig R. Poulsen died in 1906. His nephew Louis took over the business and, two years later, moved it to Nyhavn 11. In 2019 the headquarters moved to Holmen, in Copenhagen, which is the location of the company's head office. Five years later, Sophus Kaastrup-Olsen became a partner in the firm, whose name is changed to Louis Poulsen & Co. In 1914 Louis Poulsen & Co. published its first catalogue – featuring machines and tools. In 1917, Sophus Kaastrup-Olsen bought Louis Poulsen's share in the firm for 10,000 Danish kroner and became the sole owner of Louis Poulsen & Co.

Designer Poul Henningsen began working together with Louis Poulsen in 1924, with a view to taking part in an international exhibition for decorative art to be held in Paris called "Exposition Internationale des Arts Decoratifs & Industriels Modernes". A competition was held to find qualified participants: Henningsen was one of the winners. Next year, Poul Henningsen's lamps earned Gold medals in this exhibition.

In 1926 Louis Poulsen and Poul Henningsen were awarded a contract to provide lighting for the newly constructed Forum building in Copenhagen using the now-legendary PH lamp with three shades system.

Louis Poulsen started marketing light fittings, and its first lighting catalogue was published with descriptions in Danish, German, English and French.
In 1941, at the time of World War II, Louis Poulsen & Co. A/S acquired the Laurits Henriksen metal goods factory in Copenhagen and became a manufacturer of lighting fittings.

Henningsen designed a blackout lamp for the Tivoli Gardens in Copenhagen which allows the Gardens to stay open until midnight: the light from the lamps cannot be seen from aeroplanes flying over the city.

The PH5 lamp was launched in 1958: the 5 in its name refers to its 50 cm diameter.

The first lighting subsidiary outside Denmark was set up in Western Germany in 1962. Other subsidiaries were established in France, in 1964 and in Sweden, 1975. In 1967 the partnership I/S El-Salg was founded. After 2 years Elpefa A/S moved to a new factory building at Sluseholmen and took over all production and assembly of fixtures and fittings. In 1977 Elpefa A/S merged with Louis Poulsen. Louis Poulsen class B shares were quoted on the Copenhagen Stock Exchange for the first time. 1985, a lighting subsidiary in the United States, a wholesale electrical supplies business in the Faroe Islands, and JO-EL A/S were set up. In 1987 a lighting subsidiary in Norway was established. Louis Poulsen Group sales passed the 1 billion DKK mark. Subsidiaries in Australia and Netherlands were opened the following year. In 1989, Louis Poulsen purchased Skandia Havemann's El A/S, thereby acquiring 16 wholesale electrical supplies outlets.

Poul Henningsen would have turned 100 years old on 9 September 1994. Louis Poulsen & Co. A/S celebrated the occasion by publishing a book on the history of the PH lamp, by recreating the PH table lamp and TREPH pendant of the late 1920s, and by arranging an exhibition of old PH lamps at the Design Museum Danmark (Kunstindustrimuseet) in Copenhagen.

In 2004, Louis Poulsen Lighting, Fritz Hansen, Royal Copenhagen and Bang & Olufsen cooperated on an exhibition in Tokyo on the occasion of Queen Margrethe's official visit to Japan in November. The exhibition titled "Styling Danish Life" was created by the world-famous architect Tadao Ando.

In June 2018, an investment subsidiary of Investindustrial VI L.P. (“Investindustrial”) acquired Louis Poulsen A/S. The transaction was subject to customary regulatory approvals and closed in Q3 2018.

References

 http://www.louispoulsen.com/
 http://www.louispoulsen.com/int/about-us/history.aspx
 https://www.louispoulsen.com/usa/media-press-room/press-release/investindustrial-acquires-louis-poulsen/
 Louis Poulsen  Background information on the history and design drafts at the design agency TAGWERC

External links

 

Danish brands
Lighting brands
Furniture companies of Denmark
Manufacturing companies based in Copenhagen
Danish companies established in 1874